High diving at the 2023 World Aquatics Championships will be held from 14 to 22 July 2023.

Schedule
Two events will be held.

All times are local (UTC+9).

Medal summary

Medal table

Medal events

References

External links
 Official website

 
2023 World Aquatics Championships
High diving at the World Aquatics Championships
Diving competitions in Japan